Brad is a given name, usually a diminutive form (hypocorism) of Bradley, Bradford or Brady and generally masculine. Notable people with the name include:

Sports 
 Brad Rowe (tennis) (born 1955), American tennis player
 Brad Farrow (born 1956), Canadian judoka
 Brad Holland (born 1956), American basketball player and coach
 Brad Anae (born 1957), American football player
 Brad Butterworth (born 1959), New Zealand yachtsman
 Brad Leaf (born 1960), Israeli-American basketball player
 Brad Noffsinger (born 1960), American NASCAR driver
 Brad Gilbert (born 1961), American tennis player and coach
 Brad Willock (born 1962), Canadian volleyball player
 Brad Wright (basketball) (born 1962), American basketball player
 Brad MacGregor (born 1964), Canadian ice hockey player
 Brad Johnson (American football) (born 1968), American football player
 Brad Ausmus (born 1969), American baseball player and manager
 Brad Beven (born 1969), Australian triathlete
 Brad Rowe (footballer) (born 1969), Australian football player
 Brad Lebo (born 1970), American football player
 Brad Williams (cricketer) (born 1974), Australian cricketer
 Brad Thorn (born 1975), Australian rugby player
 Brad Stevens (born 1976), American basketball coach
 Brad Wilkerson (born 1977), American baseball player
 Brad Williamson (ice hockey) (born 1977), Canadian ice hockey player
 Brad Hawpe (born 1979), American baseball player
 Brad Holmes (born 1979), American football executive
 Brad Richards (born 1980), Canadian ice hockey player
 Brad Williamson (basketball) (born 1981), Australian basketball player
 Brad Boyes (born 1982), Canadian ice hockey player
 Brad Newley (born 1985), Australian basketball player
 Brad Gobright (1988-2019), American rock climber
 Brad Marchand (born 1988), Canadian ice hockey player
 Brad Loesing (born 1989), American basketball player
 Brad Erdos (born 1990), Canadian football player
 Brad Goldberg (born 1990), American baseball pitcher
 Brad Wing (born 1991), American football player
 Brad Kaaya (born 1995), American football player
 Brad McKay (born 1993), Scottish football player
 Brad Seaton (born 1993), American football player

Arts and entertainment 
 Brad Dexter (1917–2002), American actor
 Brad Carlson, also known as Bun E. Carlos (born 1950), American drummer
 Brad Dourif (born 1950), American actor
 Brad Delp (1951–2007), American singer and songwriter, member of the rock band Boston
 Brad Williams (puppeteer) (1951–1993), American puppet designer for TV programs and literacy education
 Brad Altman (born 1954), American producer and husband of actor George Takei
 Brad Bird (born 1957), American director
 Brad Hall (born 1958), American screenwriter
 Bradley Whitford (born 1959), American actor sometimes credited as "Brad Whitford"
 Brad Garrett (born 1960), American actor
 Brad Whitford (born 1952), American guitarist
 Brad Pitt (born 1963), American actor
 Brad Silberling (born 1963), American director
 Brad Roberts (born 1964), Canadian musician
 Brad Sherwood (born 1964), American comedian/actor
 Bradley Nowell (born 1965), American punk rock songwriter
 Brad Wilk (born 1968), American musician
 Brad Mehldau (born 1970), American jazz pianist
 Brad Rowe (actor) (born 1970), American actor
 Brad Falchuk (born 1971), American director
 Brad Hargreaves (born 1971), American drummer
 Brad Paisley (born 1972), American country musician
 Brad Delson (born 1977), American guitarist
 Brad Renfro (1982–2008), American actor
 Brad Williams (comedian) (born 1984), American comedian and actor
 Brad Kavanagh (born 1992), British actor
 Brad Simpson (born 1995), British musician

Politics 
 Brad Raffensperger (born 1955), Georgia Secretary of State
 Brad Ellsworth (born 1958), U.S. Representative from Indiana
 Brad Henry (born 1963), Governor of Oklahoma
 Brad Hoylman (born 1965), New York state senator
 Brad Wall (born 1965), Premier of Saskatchewan
 Brad Finstad (born 1976), Minnesota state representative

Other 
 Brad Hawkins (disambiguation), multiple people
 Brad Lomax (born 1950), American human rights and disability activist
 Brad A. Myers (born 1956), American professor
 Brad Williams (mnemonist) (born c. 1956), American, one of the only three people in the world with a condition called hyperthymestic syndrome
 Brad Farmer (born c.1959), Australian Marine Conservationist
 Brad McKay (doctor) (born 1970), Australian medical doctor, skeptic, television personality and author
 Brad Colbert (born 1974), American Marine

Fictional characters 
 Brad, a character in the American TV miniseries V (1983 miniseries)
 Brad Anderson, a character in the 1987 American teen movie Adventures in Babysitting
 Brad Armstrong, a character in the video game Lisa: The Painful
 Brad Bellick, in the television series Prison Break
 Brad Bodick, in the ABC television series The Middle
 Brad Brillnick, a character in the American sitcom It's Garry Shandling's Show
 Brad Buttowski, in the animated television series Kick Buttowski: Suburban Daredevil
 Brad Burns, in the video game Virtua Fighter
 Brad Carbunkle, in the animated television series My Life as a Teenage Robot
 Brad Chase, in the television series Boston Legal
 Brad Follmer, in the television series The X-Files
 Brad Gurdlinger, a character in the 2013 American crime comedy movie We're the Millers
 Brad Heinmuller, a character in the 1984 American science fiction romance movie Starman
 Brad King, in the soap opera Hollyoaks
 Brad Langford, a character in the American TV sitcom Silver Spoons
 Brad Majors, in the musical The Rocky Horror Show
 Brad Snider in the video game Grand Theft Auto V
 Brad Snyder (As the World Turns), in the American soap opera As The World Turns
 Brad Taylor, in the television series Home Improvement
 Brad Turner, a character in the animated show M.A.S.K. (TV series)
 Brad Whitaker, in the 1987 James Bond film The Living Daylights
 Brad White, a character in 2001 psychological horror movie Frailty
 Brad Williams (EastEnders), in the British soap opera EastEnders
 Brad Williams, in the American comedy series Happy Endings
 Brad Wilson, a character in the 1983 superhero movie Superman III
 Brad Wong, in the video game Dead or Alive

English masculine given names
Masculine given names
Hypocorisms